is a song recorded by Sayuri Sugawara as her second single. The single was released on December 2, 2009, by For Life Music. The song is the theme song for the Japanese release of Final Fantasy XIII. The B-side, "Eternal Love" was also used in the game as the insert song. The other B-side, "Christmas Again" samples a piece of Franz Liszt's work.

Track listing

Live performances
At a Final Fantasy event, held on November 29, 2009, Sugawara was present and in front of 2,000 Final Fantasy fans she performed both "Kimi ga Iru Kara" and "Eternal Love". Sugawara also performed "Kimi ga Iru Kara" on the December 6 episode of Music Japan.

Reception

Critical reception
The single received poor reviews from critics. Gann of RPGFan called it "vanilla" and said that the single, especially the headline track, was over-produced and uninteresting. While he did not mind "Eternal Love" as much, he still felt that the CD was his least favorite Final Fantasy theme single. Square Enix Music Online had similar opinions of the release, calling it "bland". They felt that while "Kimi ga Iru Kara" was better than "My Hands" and "Eternal Love" still, the single was disappointing both in the context of Final Fantasy singles and of Sugawara's previous discography.

Chart performance
On the Oricon single chart, "Kimi ga Iru Kara" peaked at number 11. The single charted for 11 weeks and is currently her best-selling single, with 36,400 copies sold. The digital version of the song was certified gold by the Recording Industry Association of Japan.

See also
 Music of Final Fantasy XIII

References 

2010 singles
Final Fantasy music
The Sxplay songs
Video game theme songs
2009 songs
Song recordings produced by Sin (music producer)